Tim-Kevin Ravnjak (born 5 November 1996) is a Slovenian snowboarder. He is a two-time Olympian representing Slovenia at the  2018 Winter Olympics in Pyongchang and the 2014 Winter Olympics in Sochi. In the 2014 Games, he competed in halfpipe and finished 8th.

References

External links
 
 
 
 

1996 births
Living people
Slovenian male snowboarders
Snowboarders at the 2014 Winter Olympics
Snowboarders at the 2018 Winter Olympics
Olympic snowboarders of Slovenia
Snowboarders at the 2012 Winter Youth Olympics